Skjervangen is a lake in the municipality of Eidskog in Innlandet county, Norway.

See also
List of lakes in Norway

References

Eidskog
Lakes of Innlandet